WuXi AppTec (WuXi  is pronounced as Wu-shee) is a global pharmaceutical, biopharmaceutical, and medical device company.

The company covers the development cycle through five core operations, including small molecule R&D and manufacturing, biologics R&D and manufacturing, cell therapy and gene therapy R&D and manufacturing, medical device testing, and molecular testing and genomics.

History
WuXi's founder is Dr. Ge Li, an organic chemist, who founded WuXi PharmaTech in Shanghai in December 2000.
 
WuXi established services in synthetic chemistry in 2001, manufacturing process development in 2003, research manufacturing in 2004, bioanalytical services in 2005, service biology in 2006, and toxicology and formulation in 2007. On December 14, 2006, WuXi PharmaTech announced that it was ranked 173rd on the Deloitte Technology Fast 500 Asia Pacific 2006. The company opened chemistry facilities in Tianjin in 2007. In 2008, WuXi PharmaTech acquired AppTec Laboratory Services Inc., a US-based company founded in 2001 with expertise in medical-device and biologics testing and with facilities in St. Paul, MN; Philadelphia, PA; and Atlanta, GA. WuXi opened a toxicology facility in Suzhou in 2009.

WuXi opened a large-scale manufacturing facility in Jinshan in 2010. The company began a biologics discovery, development, and manufacturing operation in Shanghai and Wuxi City in 2011. At the same year, WuXi acquired MedKey, a China-based clinical research company, and Abgent, a San Diego company and one of the world's largest manufacturers of antibodies for biological research and drug discovery. In 2012, WuXi opened a chemistry facility in Wuhan and a GMP biologics drug-substance facility in Wuxi City. That year WuXi also entered into a joint venture with MedImmune, the biologics arm of AstraZeneca, to co-develop MEDI5117, an anti-IL6 antibody for rheumatoid arthritis for the Chinese market. In 2013, WuXi formed a joint venture with the global clinical contract research organization PRA International (now called PRA Health Sciences) to build a clinical research business in China.

In 2014, WuXi opened a new biologics biosafety testing facility in Suzhou. In the same year, WuXi acquired XenoBiotic Laboratories, Inc. (XBL), a contract research organization with 27 years of operation that provides bioanalytical, drug metabolism, and pharmacokinetic services to the pharmaceutical, animal health, and agrochemical industries.

In 2015, WuXi completed its merger with WuXi Merger Limited, a wholly owned subsidiary of New WuXi Life Science Limited. As a result of the merger, New WuXi Life Science Limited acquired the company in a cash transaction valued at approximately US$3.3 billion. In 2016, WuXi's STA subsidiary opened a new campus in Changzhou and operations in San Diego. In the same year, WuXi acquired Crelux GmbH, a structure-based drug discovery provider based in Munich, Germany. In 2017, WuXi acquired HD Biosciences (HDB), a biology focused preclinical drug discovery contract research organization (CRO).

Company segments and subsidiaries
WuXi AppTec provides services to its customers primarily in the pharmaceutical, biotech, and other life science industries, as well as research institutes, disease-focused and non-profit foundations.  There are 5 areas of focus for services:

Small Molecule Therapeutics R&D, Manufacturing and Testing
Biologicals Therapeutics R&D and Manufacturing
Gene- and Cell-based Therapies Manufacturing
Medical Device Testing
Genomics and Molecular Diagnostics.

WuXi NextCODE
In 2015, the company launched the subsidiary WuXi NextCODE following the acquisition of NextCODE Health, a bioinformatics startup company which emerged from the Icelandic firm deCODE genetics in 2013.  The subsidiary had offices in Boston and Woburn, Massachusetts (US); Reykjavik (Iceland) and Shanghai (China).

References

External links

Manufacturing companies based in Shanghai
Pharmaceutical companies of China
Companies formerly listed on the New York Stock Exchange
Companies listed on the Shanghai Stock Exchange
Companies listed on the Hong Kong Stock Exchange
Pharmaceutical companies established in 2000
Contract research organizations
Multinational companies headquartered in China
Life sciences industry
Chinese brands
Chinese companies established in 2000